Blue Canyon–Nyack Airport  is an airport in Emigrant Gap, Placer County, California.

The airport is served by a single asphalt runway, 15/33. The runway is closed and unlighted from sunset to sunrise. The airport, in the Sierra Nevada mountain range, is surrounded by trees and is closed during winter because there are no deicing or snow removal facilities at the airport.

CTAF/MULTICOM: 122.90 MHz

Weather Data Services: (ID)BLU / (Type) WX ASOS /  120.075 MHz

Runway length = 3,300 feet, width = 50 feet

Airport elevation =  (above sea level)

During major fires the airport is used as a helipad.

References

External links

Airports in Placer County, California
Sierra Nevada (United States)